The Lincoln National Bank robbery took place on September 17, 1930 when a group of armed men entered a bank in Lincoln, Nebraska, stole approximately $2.7 million in cash and securities, and then fled with help of a getaway driver. No one was seriously injured during the robbery. The majority of the money was never recovered.

The robbery was the largest in American history until the Great Brink's Robbery twenty years later.

Robbery

A stolen Buick Master Six sedan with Iowa license plates stopped at 10:02 AM on September 17, 1930 in front of the Lincoln National Bank & Trust Company building, located at the intersection of 12th and O Streets in downtown Lincoln. Five men dressed in dark business suits got out of the car, leaving a driver behind the wheel with the engine still running. One man stationed himself in front of the bank. Four entered the bank, one staying just inside the front door as the other three conducted the robbery. All the men were armed. None wore a mask.

The robbers forced people inside of the bank to lay down on the floor. One collected the people downstairs and moved them at gunpoint to the main floor. The robbers demanded to speak to assistant cashier H. E. Leinberger, seemingly aware that he was the only one who could open the bank vault door. Leinberger was not present, but it was discovered that the vault door's time lock had not been set correctly, allowing access. The men collected cash, silver, and securities from the vault and from bank teller cages into pillowcases.

A customer, Hugh Werner, started to enter the bank and immediately left again when she saw the robbery in progress. She went across the street to a radio store and told an employee there to call the police. Two officers were able to reach the bank while the robbery was in progress. Only one of officers was armed, with a revolver. They felt they were no match for the man posted in front of the bank, who had a machine gun. The robber motioned with his machine gun to indicate the police should leave, which they did.

Robbers used their weapons to intimidate bystanders as the pillowcases of money were loaded into the Buick. Authorities were not able to track the car when they drove away.

Arrests

Three of the six suspects were eventually arrested. Two were never identified. Gus Winkeler, a member of Al Capone's gang, made a deal to avoid prosecution in exchange aiding in the recovery of $600,000 in bonds.

References

1930 in Nebraska
Bank robberies
Crime in Nebraska